Grohe, Grohé, or Gröhe is a surname. It is the surname of:

Friedrich Grohe, founder of sanitary fittings company Grohe, son of Hans
Gabrielle Grohe, owner of the Black Star of Queensland star sapphire
Hagen Grohe, vocalist for The Joe Perry Project
Hans Grohe (born 1871), founder of sanitary fittings company Hansgrohe, father of Friedrich
Hermann Gröhe (born 1961), German politician
Josef Grohé (1902–1987), German Nazi Party official
Marcelo Grohe (born 1987), Brazilian footballer
Martin Grohe (born 1967), German mathematician and computer scientist